Tom Nevers may refer to:

 Tom Nevers Naval Facility
 Thomas Nevers, American soccer player
 Tom Nevers, Nantucket, American Indian